John Ponsonby may refer to:
 John Ponsonby (politician) (1713–1789), Irish politician
 John Ponsonby, 1st Viscount Ponsonby (c. 1772 – 1855), British diplomat
 John Ponsonby, 4th Earl of Bessborough (1781–1847), English politician
 John Ponsonby, 5th Earl of Bessborough (1809–1880), British politician
 John Ponsonby (British Army officer) (1866–1952), British general
 John Ponsonby (RAF officer) (1955-2022), senior commander in the Royal Air Force